This is a list of episodes of the Philippine variety show Running Man Philippines in 2022. The show airs on GMA Network as part of their Comedy Weekend lineup. Season 1 have 12 chapters for a total of 32 episodes  (episode 3 was divided into Chapter 1 and Chapter 2). Each chapter consists of 2 to 3 episodes.


Episodes

Viewership

References 

Lists of television episodes
Philippine television episodes